This is a list of earthquakes that have occurred in or near the US state of Nevada. Only earthquakes with a magnitude of 6.0 or greater will be included. Smaller quakes will not be listed unless they have caused damage, death or injury.

See also 
List of earthquakes in Utah
List of earthquakes in California
List of earthquakes in the United States

References

Further reading 
Eric Eckert, Michelle Scalise, John N. Louie, Kenneth D. Smith; Exploring Basin Amplification within the Reno Metropolitan Area in Northern Nevada Using a Magnitude 6.3 ShakeOut Scenario. Bulletin of the Seismological Society of America 2021; doi: https://doi.org/10.1785/0120200309

Disasters in Nevada
Earthquakes in Nevada